Nicolae Szoboszlay (18 July 1925 – 2 January 2019) was a Romanian football goalkeeper and manager.

Career
Nicolae Szoboszlay was one of Universitatea Cluj's players in the hardest period of the club's history. In 1940, the team moved from Cluj to Sibiu as a result of the Second Vienna Award, when the northern part of Transylvania was ceded to Hungary. In 1945, after the end of the Second World War and the return of the northern part of Transylvania to Romania, "U" returned to its home in Cluj. During that period he participated at a game played in Ploiești, which was postponed for one day because of a fog caused by the bombs thrown in Ploiești by the United States Army Air Forces. In 1944, because of his Hungarian origins, Szoboszlay was forced to work for two months at the București-Craiova railway. In 1948 he played for CSCA București under the name "Nicolae Săbăslău", because the person who was sent to București to make his ID wrongly wrote his name that way. On 21 November 1948 he played in the first ever CSCA București – Dinamo București derby. While playing for Armata Cluj, in May 1953 after one game the team coach Elemer Hirsch collapsed on his way to the team bus, Szoboszlay tried to give him first aid but Hirsch died in his arms.

After he retired from his playing career he worked as a manager and as an assistant coach. Between 1976 and 1985 he was the coordinator of the Center for Children and Juniors at Universitatea Cluj where he taught and formed generations of players, which include Remus Câmpeanu, Emil Petru, Vasile Suciu, Septimiu Câmpeanu, Alpar Meszaros, Zsolt Muzsnay, Ioan Sabău and Tiberiu Bălan. A book about him was written by Cristian Aszalos, called Ultimul cavaler al fotbalului romantic, Nicolae Szoboszlay (The last knight of the romantic football, Nicolae Szoboszlay), being released on 26 November 2016. On 18 July 2013, on his 88th birthday he was awarded the Honorary Citizen of Cluj County title.

Honours

Player
Universitatea Cluj 
Divizia B: 1950
CSCA București
Cupa României: 1948–49

Manager
Universitatea Cluj (assistant)
Divizia B: 1957–58
Dermata Cluj
Divizia C: 1958–59
Arieșul Turda
Divizia C: 1970–71

Notes

References

 

1925 births
2019 deaths
Romanian footballers
Association football goalkeepers
Liga I players
Liga II players
Liga III players
FC Universitatea Cluj players
FC Steaua București players
Romanian football managers
FC Universitatea Cluj managers
CS Corvinul Hunedoara managers
CFR Cluj managers
People from Orăștie